"All My Rowdy Friends (Have Settled Down)" is a song written and recorded by American country music artist Hank Williams Jr.  It was released in September 1981 as the first single from the album The Pressure Is On.  The song was Williams Jr.'s fifth number one on the country chart.  The single stayed at number one for one week and spent a total of ten weeks on the country chart.

The phrase "all my rowdy friends" would later become a catch phrase of sorts for Williams, who would use the line in 1984 for "All My Rowdy Friends Are Coming Over Tonight," in 1987 for "Born to Boogie" and "All My Rowdy Friends Are Here on Monday Night," and in 2011 for "Keep the Change."

Content
The song itself is told from the point of view of a disillusioned singer who, along with his friends, had lived a wild lifestyle but have since settled down and, in abandoning their high-living ways, want no part of their old lifestyle. Although admitting he himself has mellowed with age and can no longer take the physical toll of his past hard partying, the singer is depressed and wishes there were someone left to relive the old times. References are made to Williams' contemporaries in the outlaw movement, such as George Jones (whom Williams is glad is recovering from his addictions), Waylon Jennings (spending more time with Jessi Colter), Johnny Cash (not living like he did in 1968) and Kris Kristofferson (who moved to Hollywood to become an actor). Williams compares the situation to the song "Lost Highway" recorded by his father Hank Sr.

Charts

References

1981 singles
1981 songs
Hank Williams Jr. songs
Songs written by Hank Williams Jr.
Song recordings produced by Jimmy Bowen
Elektra Records singles
Curb Records singles